Prince Kashemsri Subhayok, the Prince Divakaravongse Pravati [RTGS: Kasemsi Supphayok, the Prince Thiwakon Wongprawat] (พระเจ้าบรมวงศ์เธอ พระองค์เจ้าเกษมศรีศุภโยค กรมหมื่นทิวากรวงศ์ประวัติ), was the thirtieth child of King Rama IV of Thailand, and the fourth child born to Chao Chom Manda Chan, a royal consort of the King, born on 17 August 1857. He was known for his artistic, poetic, and architectural contributions, and served as a privy councillor during the reign of his brother King Chulalongkorn. 

King Rama V elevated his royal rank to Kromma Muen (กรมหมื่น), and granted him the titular name of Divakaravongse Pravati (ทิวากรวงศ์ประวัติ) in 1896.

He is the founder of the House of Kashemsri (ราชสกุลเกษมศรี)

Prince Kashemsri Subhayok died in the reign of King Rama VI, on 3 January 1915 at the age of 57 due to illness. King Vajiravudh (Rama VI) presided over the initial funeral rites, before ordering that the prince's body be kept in a ceremonial urn for one year of prayer as was customary for Siamese royals of higher rank. The king also decreed that government officials would observe the funeral of the late prince by wearing mourning attire for fifteen days. After the rites concluded, King Vajiravudh presided over the prince's cremation at Wat Benchamabophit on 11 June 1916. The prince's remains were interred within the royal cloisters surrounding the chedi of Wat Makut Kasattriyaram, the temple of his father King Mongkut. Since then, many members of the House of Kashemsri have chosen to have their remains interred within Wat Makut as well.

Issue 
Prince Kasemsi Supphayok had 10 consorts:
 Mom Poem (formerly: Sarobol)
 Mom Plad
 Mom Lamai (formerly: Panikbudh)
 Mom Pao
 Her Serene Highness Princess (Mom Chao) Prasansap (formerly: House of Singhara), the daughter of His Royal Highness Prince Singhara, the Prince Bondinpaisansopon Thikachonchoetprayun
 Mom Son (formerly: Puangnak)
 Mom Cham
 Mom Choey
 Mom Chua
 Mom Waen (formerly: Panikbudh)

The prince had 30 children, with 18 sons and 12 daughters.

Honours 
  The Most Illustrious Order of the Royal House of Chakri (Knight)
  King Rama IV Royal Cypher Medal Class 2 (ม.ป.ร.2)

References

 
Thai male Phra Ong Chao
Children of Mongkut
Members of the Privy Council of Thailand
1857 births
1915 deaths
19th-century Chakri dynasty
20th-century Chakri dynasty
Sons of kings